Eumimesis carbonelli is a species of beetle in the family Cerambycidae. It was described by Lane in 1973. It is known from Ecuador and Peru. It is named in honour of the Uruguayan entomologist Carlos S. Carbonell (1917–2019).

References

Calliini
Beetles described in 1973